Midnight Waltz is an album by pianist Cedar Walton which was recorded in 2005 and released on the Japanese Venus label.

Reception 
AllMusic reviewed the album stating "During his long career, Cedar Walton has been one of hard bop's most lyrical pianists, as demonstrated on this 2005 trio session for the Japanese label Venus.  No matter the tempo or approach, it is very easy to find oneself singing along with Walton's infectious melodies".

Track listing 
All compositions by Cedar Walton
 "Bremond's Blues" – 5:16 		
 "Turquoise Twice" – 6:13
 "Cedar's Blues" – 4:54
 "Midnight Waltz" – 9:42
 "Holy Land" – 6:53
 "Theme for Jobim" – 4:35
 "Dear Ruth" – 10:20
 "The Vision" – 5:59
 "Bolivia" – 7:55
 "Ugetsu" – 6:04

Personnel 
 Cedar Walton – piano
 David Williams – bass
 Jimmy Cobb – drums

References 

Cedar Walton albums
2005 albums
Venus Records albums